Frances M. A. Healy  is a British archaeologist and prehistorian, specialising in the British Neolithic and lithic technology. She has worked for Norfolk Archaeological Unit, English Heritage, Wessex Archaeology, and Oxford Archaeology. She has been a research associate at Newcastle University and Cardiff University, where she has been an honorary research fellow since 2007.

Healy studied internation relations at the London School of Economics and Political Science, graduating with an upper second class honours Bachelor of Science (BSc) degree in 1965. She then undertook a postgraduate diploma in prehistoric archaeology at the Institute of Archaeology, University of London, which she completed in 1967. On a part-time basis she undertook research for a Doctor of Philosophy (PhD) degree at the Institute of Archaeology, which she competed in 1990 with a thesis tiled "The neolithic in Norfolk".

In 1990, Healy was elected a Fellow of the Society of Antiquaries of London (FSA). In 2020, she was awarded the Grahame Clark Medal by the British Academy "for her distinguished achievements involving recent contributions to the study of prehistoric archaeology, with a particular focus on the British Neolithic".

Selected works
Roger Mercer and Frances Healy, 2008, Hambledon Hill, Dorset, England: Excavation and survey of a Neolithic Monument Complex and its Surrounding Landscape, Volume 1, English Heritage Archaeological Monographs.

References

External links
Archaeology Data Service entry

British archaeologists
British women archaeologists
Prehistorians
Fellows of the Society of Antiquaries of London
Living people
Year of birth missing (living people)
Alumni of the London School of Economics
Alumni of the UCL Institute of Archaeology